Pedapulivarru is a village in Guntur district of the Indian state of Andhra Pradesh. It is the located in Bhattiprolu mandal of Tenali revenue division. It forms a part of Andhra Pradesh Capital Region.

Geography 

Government and politics 

Pedapulivarru gram panchayat is the local self-government of the village. It is divided into wards and each ward is represented by a ward member.

Economy 

The major occupation of the village is agriculture and the crops cultivated include, paddy, banana and turmeric.

Education 

As per the school information report for the academic year 2018–19, the village has a total of 7 Zilla/Mandal Parishad Schools.

See also 
 List of villages in Guntur district

References 

Villages in Guntur district